Dimitar Paskov (18 October 1914, Gorno Brodi – 24 April 1986, Bulgaria) is a Bulgarian chemist who led the Sopharma team that extracted Nivalin (Galantamine) in 1959. The original phytopreparation is an extract of the alkaloid from bulbs of common snowdrop.

Galantamine hydrobromide (Nivalin) has formula C17H21NO3.HBr and molecular weight 386.3.

References

Bulgarian scientists
Bulgarian chemists
1914 births
1996 deaths
Bulgarians from Aegean Macedonia

People from Serres (regional unit)